Lawrie Smith (born 19 February 1956) is a British sailor. He won a bronze medal in the soling class at the 1992 Summer Olympics with Robert Cruikshank and Ossie Stewart.

He was the skipper of various yachts at the Whitbread Round the World Race in 1989–90, 1993–94 and 1997–98.

He was the Overall Winner of the Henri Lloyd 'Outstanding Act of Seamanship' Award at the 1989–90 Whitbread Round the World Race .

References

External links
 
 
 

1956 births
Living people
British male sailors (sport)
Olympic sailors of Great Britain
Olympic bronze medallists for Great Britain
Olympic medalists in sailing
Sailors at the 1988 Summer Olympics – Soling
Sailors at the 1992 Summer Olympics – Soling
Medalists at the 1992 Summer Olympics
Volvo Ocean Race sailors
1983 America's Cup sailors
Dragon class world champions
Fireball class world champions
World champions in sailing for Great Britain